Trophon geversianus, commonly known as Gevers's Trophon, is a species of sea snail, a marine gastropod mollusk in the family Muricidae, the murex snails or rock snails.

The two varieties Trophon geversianus var. calva Kobelt, 1878 and Trophon geversianus var. lirata Kobelt, 1878 have been synonymized with Trophon geversianus (Pallas, 1774)

Description
The size of an adult shell varies between 30 mm and 111 mm. Highly variable. Aperture greater than 1/2 of length, brown to violaceous (always coloured). Exterior with strong lamellae. Also with spiral cords, alone or forming a reticulate with the lamellae, or smooth. Brown to whitish, dull. Feeding Mytilidae on intertidal rocks.

Distribution
This species is found in the Atlantic Ocean off Argentina, the Falkland islands and Tierra del Fuego, Chile.

References

 Lamarck J.B. (1816). Liste des objets représentés dans les planches de cette livraison. In: Tableau encyclopédique et méthodique des trois règnes de la Nature. Mollusques et Polypes divers. Agasse, Paris. 16 pp.
 Engl, W. (2012). Shells of Antarctica. Hackenheim: Conchbooks. 402 pp

External links
 Küster, H. C.; Kobelt, W. (1839-1878). Die geschwänzten und bewehrten Purpurschnecken (Murex, Ranella, Tritonium, Trophon, Hindsia). In Abbildungen nach der Natur mit Beschreibungen. In: Systematisches Conchylien Cabinet von Martini und Chemnitz, ed. 2, Vol. 3(2): 1-336, pls 1-77. Nürnberg: Bauer & Raspe. Published in parts:
 Gmelin, J. F. (1791). Vermes. In: Gmelin J.F. (Ed.) Caroli a Linnaei Systema Naturae per Regna Tria Naturae, Ed. 13. Tome 1(6). G.E. Beer, Lipsiae 
 Schumacher, C. F. (1817). Essai d'un nouveau système des habitations des vers testacés. Schultz, Copenghagen. iv + 288 pp., 22 pls.
 Perry, G. (1811). Conchology, or the natural history of shells: containing a new arrangement of the genera and species, illustrated by coloured engravings executed from the natural specimens, and including the latest discoveries. 4 pp., 61 plates. London
 Hupé L.H. (1854). Fauna Chilena. Moluscos, pp. 1-407, In: Gay, C. (1854). Historia física y política de Chile según documentos adquiridos en esta Republica durante doce años de residencia en ella y publicada bajo los auspicios del Supremo Gobierno. Zoología, Tomo 8. Paris, published by the author, and Santiago de Chile, Museo de Historia Natural de Santiago
 Lightfoot, J. (1786). A Catalogue of the Portland Museum, lately the property of the Dutchess Dowager of Portland, deceased; which will be sold by auction by Mr. Skinner & Co. (book). London. viii + 194 pp
 Griffiths, H.J.; Linse, K.; Crame, J.A. (2003). SOMBASE - Southern Ocean mollusc database: a tool for biogeographic analysis in diversity and evolution. Organisms Diversity and Evolution. 3: 207-213
  Harasewych, M. G. (1984). Comparative anatomy of four primitive muricacean gastropods: implications for trophonine phylogeny. American Malacological Bulletin. 3(1): 11-26.
 

Gastropods described in 1774
Taxa named by Peter Simon Pallas
Trophon